Cipriano Antonio González Rivero, known as Ñito (16 September 1939 – 8 April 2021) was a Spanish professional footballer who played as a goalkeeper.

Career
Born in Santa Cruz de Tenerife, Ñito played for Tenerife, Valencia, Granada, Linares and Real Murcia.

References

1939 births
2021 deaths
Spanish footballers
Association football goalkeepers
CD Tenerife players
Valencia CF players
Granada CF footballers
Linares CF players
Real Murcia players
La Liga players
Segunda División players
Footballers from Santa Cruz de Tenerife